Nicole "Hoopz" Alexander is an American reality television show contestant best known for winning the VH1 reality TV shows Flavor of Love and I Love Money.

Early life 
Prior to Flavor of Love, Alexander worked as a Transportation Security Administration agent at Detroit Metropolitan Wayne County Airport.

Career 
In 2006, Alexander was the winner of the first season of the VH1 reality show, Flavor of Love, where she received the nickname "Hoopz".

In 2008, Alexander also was a contestant another VH1 reality show, I Love Money. After defeating Joshua "Whiteboy" Gallander at the final challenge, she was named the $250,000 winner. She also starred as Kayla in the November 2010 release, Ghetto Stories: The Movie.

Personal life 
In 2006, Alexander and rapper Flavor Flav revealed that they had broken up during the reunion of Flavor of Love. She was also formerly engaged to retired basketball player Shaquille O'Neal.

Filmography

Films

Television

Music Videos

References

External links 

Living people
Actresses from Detroit
Participants in American reality television series
Reality show winners
21st-century American women
1982 births

fi:Nicole Alexander